The 10th People's Choice Awards, honoring the best in popular culture for 1983, were held in 1984. They were broadcast on CBS.

Winners

Favorite All-Around Female Entertainer:
Barbara Mandrell,
Barbra Streisand

Favorite Children's TV Program:
Sesame Street

Favorite Female TV Performer:
Linda Evans

Favorite TV Comedy Program:
Three's Company

Favorite Male Performer in a New TV Program:
Mr. T

Favorite TV Dramatic Program:
Hill Street Blues,
Dynasty

Favorite TV Mini-Series:
The Thorn Birds

Favorite Theme/Song from a Motion Picture:
"Flashdance... What a Feeling"

Favorite Young Motion Picture Performer:
Brooke Shields

Favorite Female Performer in a New TV Program:
Madeline Kahn

Favorite Motion Picture:
Return of the Jedi

Favorite Motion Picture Actress:
Meryl Streep

Favorite New TV Comedy Program:
Webster

Favorite Country Music Performer:
Kenny Rogers

Favorite Motion Picture Actor:
Clint Eastwood,
Burt Reynolds

Favorite New TV Dramatic Program:
Hotel

Favorite Music Video:
"Thriller"

Favorite All-Around Male Entertainer:
Michael Jackson

Favorite Male TV Performer:
Tom Selleck

Favorite Overall New TV Program:
The A-Team

Favorite Young TV Performer:
Emmanuel Lewis

References

People's Choice Awards
1983 awards
1984 in American television
1983 awards in the United States
March 1984 events in the United States